Route 213 is a short highway in central Missouri, United States.  Its northern terminus is at U.S. Route 24 nine miles (14 km) north of Higginsville which is the location of its southern terminus at Route 20.

Route description
Route 213 begins at an intersection with Route 20/Route 13 Bus. in Higginsville, Lafayette County, heading northwest on a two-lane undivided road. The road passes between the Confederate Memorial State Historic Site to the west and farmland to the east before leaving Higginsville. The route heads into agricultural areas with some trees and homes, curving to the north. Route 213 continues through rural areas before coming to its northern terminus at US 24 east of Lexington.

Major intersections

References

213
Transportation in Lafayette County, Missouri